The Pacific Masters is a darts tournament that has been held annually since 1977.

List of winners

Men's

Ladies

1977 establishments in Australia
Darts tournaments